Vladimir Novokhatko (born 18 March 1941) is a retired Soviet Greco-Roman wrestler who won a European title in 1968. He took up wrestling in 1956 and after retiring from competitions worked as a wrestling coach.

References

1941 births
Living people
Soviet male sport wrestlers
Russian male sport wrestlers
European Wrestling Championships medalists